In mathematics, a local system (or a system of local coefficients) on a topological space X is a tool from algebraic topology which interpolates between cohomology with coefficients in a fixed abelian group A, and general sheaf cohomology in which coefficients vary from point to point.  Local coefficient systems were introduced by Norman Steenrod in 1943.

The category of perverse sheaves on a manifold is equivalent to the category of local systems on the manifold.

Definition
Let X be a topological space. A local system (of abelian groups/modules/...) on X is a locally constant sheaf (of abelian groups/modules...) on X. In other words, a sheaf  is a local system if every point has an open neighborhood  such that the restricted sheaf  is isomorphic to the sheafification of some constant presheaf.

Equivalent definitions

Path-connected spaces
If X is path-connected, a local system  of abelian groups has the same stalk L at every point. There is a bijective correspondence between local systems on X and group homomorphisms
 
and similarly for local systems of modules.

This shows that (for X path-connected) a local system is precisely a sheaf whose pullback to the universal cover of X is a constant sheaf.

Stronger definition on non-connected spaces
A stronger nonequivalent definition that works for non-connected X is: the following: a local system is a covariant functor

This is equivalently the data of an assignment to every point  a module  along with a group representation  such that the various  are compatible with change of basepoint  and the induced map  on fundamental groups.

Examples

This is a useful tool for computing cohomology since in good situations, there is an isomorphism between sheaf cohomology and singular cohomology: 

 Let . Since , there is an  family of local systems on X corresponding to the maps :

 Horizontal sections of vector bundles with a flat connection. If  is a vector bundle with flat connection , then there is a local system given by   For instance, take  and  the trivial bundle.

 An n-sheeted covering map  is a local system with fibers given by the set . Similarly, a fibre bundle with discrete fibre is a local system, because each path lifts uniquely to a given lift of its basepoint. (The definition adjusts to include set-valued local systems in the obvious way).

 If X is a variety, local systems are the same thing as D-modules which are additionally coherent O_X-modules (see  O modules).

 If the connection is not flat (i.e. its curvature is nonzero), then parallel transport of a fibre F_x over x around a contractible loop based at x_0 may give a nontrivial automorphism of F_x, so locally constant sheaves can not necessarily be defined for non-flat connections.

 The Gauss–Manin connection is a prominent example of a connection whose horizontal sections are studied in relation to variation of Hodge structures.

Generalization
Local systems have a mild generalization to  constructible sheaves -- a constructible sheaf on a locally path connected topological space  is a sheaf  such that there exists a stratification of

where  is a local system. These are typically found by taking the cohomology of the derived pushforward for some continuous map . For example, if we look at the complex points of the morphism

then the fibers over

If we take the derived pushforward  then we get a constructible sheaf. Over  we have the local systems

while over  we have the local systems

where  is the genus of the plane curve (which is ).

Applications

The cohomology with local coefficients in the module corresponding to the orientation covering can be used to formulate Poincaré duality for non-orientable manifolds: see Twisted Poincaré duality.

See also
 Leray spectral sequence
 Gauss–Manin connection
 D-module
 Intersection homology
 Perverse sheaf

References

External links
 
  Discusses computing the cohomology with coefficients in a local system by using the twisted de Rham complex.
 
 
 

Sheaf theory
Algebraic topology